Dorota Chytrowska-Mika (born 1 September 1954) is a Polish sports shooter. She competed in the mixed skeet event at the 1992 Summer Olympics.

References

External links
 

1954 births
Living people
Polish female sport shooters
Olympic shooters of Poland
Shooters at the 1992 Summer Olympics
Sportspeople from Warsaw